Kunduz University is located in  Kunduz province Afghanistan. It was established as a teacher training center in 1967, and became an institution of higher learning in 1994.

Kunduz University which is one of top 11 universities of Afghanistan is a co-education institute. Since 2003 Kunduz university has offered more than 8.000 graduates, including 1500 women.

Kunduz university is a non-profit private higher-education institution.

Human rights symposiums 
Kunduz university is also used for symposiums organized by UNAMA and other international organizations, such as “PROTECTING HUMAN RIGHTS IN AFGHANISTAN” in December 2019 in which more than 100 Kunduz students took part.

See also 
List of universities in Afghanistan

References

Universities in Afghanistan
University